Count Zdzisław Jan Andrzej Zamoyski (28 January 1810 - 13 August 1855) was a Polish nobleman and landowner.

Zdzisław married Józefina Walicka hr. Łada on 6 April 1834. They had four children together: Stefan Zamoyski, Zofia Zamoyska, Maria Zamoyska and Wanda Zamoyska.

He was owner of the estates in Wysock, Bobówka, Mała Wieś, Korzenica and Moszczanica. He was awarded the Gold Cross of the Virtuti Militari on 25 May 1831 during the November Uprising.

References

1810 births
1855 deaths
Nobility from Warsaw
Counts of Poland
Zdzislaw
Recipients of the Gold Cross of the Virtuti Militari